The Sri Lanka cricket team toured Australia in October and November 2019 to play three Twenty20 International (T20I) matches. In May 2019, Cricket Australia confirmed the fixtures for the tour with matches being held in Adelaide, Brisbane and Melbourne. Aaron Finch was the captain of the Australian team, while bowler Lasith Malinga captained Sri Lanka.

In the opening match played at Adelaide, Australia recorded their biggest victory in a T20I match, winning by 134 runs off the back of a century by David Warner. They scored 233 runs for the loss of two wickets, before restricting Sri Lanka to 9/99 from their twenty overs. The following game in Brisbane, Australia won by nine wickets, winning the series with a game to spare. Australia won the final match by seven wickets to win the series 3–0. Australian batsman, David Warner ended up with the top run-scorer for the series with 217, and Pat Cummins was the leading wicket-taker with six dismissals.

Squads

Ahead of the series, Andrew Tye was ruled out of Australia's squad with an elbow injury, with Sean Abbott named as his replacement. After the second game, Glenn Maxwell took an indefinite break from cricket to deal with a mental health issue and D'Arcy Short was named as his replacement.

Tour match

20 over match: Prime Minister's XI vs Sri Lanka

T20I series

1st T20I

2nd T20I

3rd T20I

Statistics

Most runs

Most wickets

Sri Lankan cricket team in India in 2019-20

References

External links
 Series home at ESPN Cricinfo

2019 in Australian cricket
2019 in Sri Lankan cricket
2019–20 Australian cricket season
International cricket competitions in 2019–20
Sri Lankan cricket tours of Australia